Dr PVG Raju ACA Sports Complex is a cricket stadium located in Vizianagram of the Indian state of Andhra Pradesh. It was inaugurated on 15 June 2013. The stadium has facilities such as  pavilion, lodging and boarding facilities and health centre.

Profile 
It has hosted five first-class matches  in 2014 when Andhra cricket team played against Kerala cricket team. The stadium hosted five Twenty20 matches  in 2014 when Andhra cricket team played against Karnataka cricket team. The stadium hosted five Women's Twenty20 International matches  in 2014 when India women cricket team played against Sri Lanka cricket team.

References

External links 
 cricketarchive
 cricinfo

Cricket grounds in Andhra Pradesh
Buildings and structures in Vizianagaram district
2013 establishments in Andhra Pradesh
Sports venues completed in 2013
Vizianagaram